Wickström (in Swedish), Wickstrøm (in Norwegian) and Wickstrom (without diacritics) is a surname with a Scandinavic origin. Notable people with the surname include:

André Wickström (born 1976), Finnish comedian and actor
Brian Wickstrom (born 1969), American athletic director
George Wickstrom and Bernie Wickstrom, father and son owners of The Zephyrhills News, a weekly broadsheet newspaper in Pasco County, Florida, U.S.A.
James Wickstrom (1942–2018), American radio personality
John Wickström (1870–1959), Finnish engineer and entrepreneur
John Wickström (speed skater) (1927–1987), Swedish speed skater
Jussi Wickström (born 1983), Finnish heavy metal guitarist
Lois Wickstrom (born 1948), American writer
Matt Wickstrom (born 1980), American Psychologist, Industrial-Organizational Psychologist and Nationally-Certified School Psychologist
Pelle Wickstrom, a swimmer of the 4 × 200 m Freestyle Relay in the 1980 Summer Olympics
Ragnar Wickström (1892–1959), Finnish footballer
Rob Wickstrom, the husband of Mary Elizabeth McDonough, an American actress most famous for her role as "Erin Walton" in the series The Waltons
Rolf Wickstrøm (1912–1941), Norwegian labour activist
Steven N. Wickstrom (born 1958), United States Army general

See also
Vikström
Wigström
Wikström

Swedish-language surnames